Package cushioning is used to protect items during shipment. Vibration and impact shock during shipment and loading/unloading are controlled by cushioning to reduce the chance of product damage.

Cushioning is usually inside a shipping container such as a corrugated box. It is designed to absorb shock by crushing and deforming, and to dampen vibration, rather than transmitting the shock and vibration to the protected item.

Internal packaging materials are also used for functions other than cushioning, such as to immobilize the products in the box and lock them in place, or to fill a void.

Design factors

When designing packaging the choice of cushioning depends on many factors, including but not limited to:
 effective protection of product from shock and vibration
 resilience (whether it performs for multiple impacts)
 resistance to creep – cushion deformation under static load
 material costs
 labor costs and productivity
 effects of temperature, humidity, and air pressure on cushioning
 cleanliness of cushioning (dust, insects, etc.)
 effect on size of external shipping container
 environmental and recycling issues
 sensitivity of product to static electricity

Common types of cushioning

Loose fill – 
Some cushion products are flowable and are packed loosely around the items in the box. The box is closed to tighten the pack. This includes expanded polystyrene foam pieces (foam peanuts), similar pieces made of starch-based foams, and common popcorn. The amount of loose fill material required and the transmitted shock levels vary with the specific type of material.

Paper –  Paper can be manually or mechanically wadded up and used as a cushioning material. Heavier grades of paper provide more weight-bearing ability than old newspapers. Creped cellulose wadding is also available. Movers often wrap objects with several layers of kraft paper or embossed pulp before putting them into boxes.

Corrugated fiberboard pads – 
Multi-layer or cut-and-folded shapes of corrugated board can be used as cushions. These structures are designed to crush and deform under shock stress and provide some degree of cushioning. Paperboard composite honeycomb structures are also used for cushioning.

Foam structures – 
Several types of polymeric foams are used for cushioning, the most common being expanded polystyrene, polypropylene, polyethylene, and polyurethane. These can be molded engineered shapes or sheets which are cut and glued into cushion structures. Convoluted (or finger) foams are sometimes used. Some degradable foams are also available.

Foam-in-place is another method of using polyurethane foams. These fill the box, fully encapsulating the product to immobilize it. It is also used to form engineered structures.

Molded pulp – 
Pulp can be molded into shapes suitable for cushioning and for immobilizing products in a package. Molded pulp is made from recycled newsprint and is recyclable.

Inflated products – 
Bubble wrap consists of sheets of plastic film with enclosed “bubbles” of air. These sheets can be layered or wrapped around items to be shipped. A variety of engineered inflatable air cushions are also available. Note that inflated air pillows used for void-fill are not suited for cushioning.

Other – 
Several other types of cushioning are available including suspension cushions, thermoformed end caps, viscoelastic materials, and various types of shock mounts.

Design for shock protection

Proper performance of cushioning is dependent on its proper design and use. It is often best to use a trained packaging engineer, reputable vendor, consultant, or independent laboratory.  
An engineer needs to know the severity of shock (drop height, etc.) to protect against.  This can be based on an existing specification, published industry standards and publications, field studies, etc.

Knowledge of the product to be packaged is critical.  Field experience may indicate the types of damage previously experienced.  Laboratory analysis can help quantify the fragility of the item, often reported in g's.  Engineering judgment can also be an excellent starting point. Sometimes a product can be made more rugged or can be supported to make it less susceptible to breakage.

The amount of shock transmitted by a particular cushioning material is largely dependent on the thickness of the cushion, the drop height, and the load-bearing area of the cushion (static loading).  A cushion must deform under shock for it to function.  If a product is on a large load-bearing area, the cushion may not deform and will not cushion the shock.  If the load-bearing area is too small, the product may “bottom out” during a shock; the shock is not cushioned.  Engineers use “cushion curves” to choose the best thickness and load-bearing area for a cushioning material. Often two to three inches (50 – 75 mm) of cushioning are needed to protect fragile items.

Computer simulations and finite element analysis are also being used.  Some correlations to laboratory drop tests have been successful. 

Cushion design requires care to prevent shock amplification caused by the cushioned shock pulse duration being close to the natural frequency of the cushioned item.

Design for vibration protection
The process for vibration protection (or isolation) involves similar considerations as that for shock. Cushions can be thought of as performing like springs.  Depending on cushion thickness and load-bearing area and on the forcing vibration frequency, the cushion may 1) not have any influence on input vibration, 2) amplify the input vibration at resonance, or 3) isolate the product from the vibration.  Proper design is critical for cushion performance.

Evaluation of finished package
Verification and validation of prototype designs are required.  The design of a package and its cushioning is often an iterative process involving several designs, evaluations, redesigns, etc.  Several (ASTM, ISTA, and others) published package testing protocols are available to evaluate the performance of a proposed package.  Field performance should be monitored for feedback into the design process.

ASTM Standards
 D1596  Standard Test Method for Dynamic Shock Cushioning Characteristics of Packaging Material
 D2221 Standard Test Method for Creep Properties of Package Cushioning Materials
 D3332 Standard Test Methods for Mechanical-Shock Fragility of Products, Using Shock Machines
 D3580 Standard Test Methods for Vibration (Vertical Linear Motion) Test of Products
 D4168 Standard Test Methods for Transmitted Shock Characteristics of Foam-in-Place Cushioning Materials
 D4169 Standard Practice for Performance Testing of Shipping Containers and Systems
 D6198 Standard Guide for Transport Packaging Design
 D6537 Standard Practice for Instrumented Package Shock Testing For Determination of Package Performance
 and others

See also
 Impact force
 Packaging and labeling
 Shock
 Shock absorber
 Shock response spectrum
 Vibration
 Vibration isolation
 Buffer (disambiguation)
 Damped wave
 Damping ratio
 Damper (disambiguation)
 Betagel, utilizes gel and silicone to absorb violent shocks
 Coefficient of restitution

Notes

Further reading
 MIL-HDBK 304C, “Package Cushioning Design”, 1997, 
 Russel, P G,  and Daum, M P, "Product Protection Test Book", Institute of Packaging Professionals
 Root, D, “Six-Step Method for Cushioned Package Development”, Lansmont, 1997,  http://www.lansmont.com/
 Yam, K. L., "Encyclopedia of Packaging Technology", John Wiley & Sons, 2009, 
 Singh, J., Ignatova, L., Olsen, E. and Singh, P., "Evaluation of the Stress-Energy Methodology to Predict Transmitted Shock through Expanded Foam Cushions", ASTM Journal of Testing and Evaluation, Volume 38, Issue 6, November 2010

External links
 Institute of Packaging Professionals
 International Safe Transit Association
 Westpak webinar on protective packaging

Packaging
Plastics applications

da:Emballage
de:Verpackung
es:Embalaje
fr:Emballage